Roseann is an unincorporated community in Buchanan County, Virginia, in the United States.

History
A post office was established at Roseann in 1934, and remained in operation until it was discontinued in 1964. The community was named for the daughter of the owner of a local coal mine.

References

Unincorporated communities in Buchanan County, Virginia
Unincorporated communities in Virginia